I've Never Seen Star Wars is a comedy chat show broadcast on BBC Four (2009 episodes) and BBC Two (2011 episodes), first broadcast on 12 March 2009. Created and produced by Bill Dare and hosted by Marcus Brigstocke for the 2009 episodes and Jo Brand for the 2011 special episode, each episode features a celebrity guest trying out new experiences. Based on the original radio version broadcast on BBC Radio 4, the title comes from the fact that Dare has never seen the Star Wars films. An eight part series was recorded in March 2009, with guests including John Humphrys, Esther Rantzen, Rory McGrath and Hugh Dennis.

A new host, Jo Brand, presented a December 2011 episode.

Format
Each episode of I've Never Seen Star Wars features a different guest trying things they have never done before, and seeing whether they liked their experiences or not. Some of the experiences come from the show's special list, which contains a range of different experiences, such as certain books, films, foodstuffs etc. The experiences tend to a mixture of things from the list and things the guest wants to try out themselves. The guest and Brigstocke try out the experience and the guest gives their view on it, as well as giving each experiences a mark out of ten.

Series 1

Special

Notes
I've Never Seen Star Wars (The TV Version) – Episode Guide. Published by the British Comedy Guide. Retrieved 2009-03-02.

References

External links

2009 British television series debuts
2011 British television series endings
2000s British comedy television series
2010s British comedy television series
BBC Television shows
BBC television talk shows
Television series based on radio series
English-language television shows